Henry Raabe Méndez (born March 14, 1983) is a Costa Rican road racing cyclist. He represented Costa Rica at the 2008 Summer Olympics in Beijing, where he competed for the men's road race. Raabe, however, was lapped and disqualified from the run, before reaching the 185.0 km lap of the course.

In August 2020, Raabe was diagnosed with non-Hodgkin lymphoma.

Major results
Source: 

2002
 Vuelta Ciclista a Costa Rica
1st Stages 8 & 11
2003
 Vuelta Ciclista a Costa Rica
1st Stages 3a (TTT) & 9
2004
 1st Stage 5 (TTT) Vuelta Ciclista a Costa Rica
2005
 National Under-23 Road Championships
1st  Road race
1st  Time trial
 2nd Overall Vuelta Ciclista a Costa Rica
1st Stage 6
2006
 National Road Championships
1st  Road race
1st  Time trial
1st  Under-23 time trial
 1st Overall  Vuelta Ciclista a Costa Rica
1st Prologue, Stages 3 (ITT) & 5
 10th Time trial, Pan American Road Championships
2007
 1st Overall  Vuelta Ciclista a Costa Rica
1st Stages 3 (ITT), 7, 8 & 13
2008
 National Road Championships
1st  Time trial
2nd Road race
 7th Time trial, Pan American Road Championships
 9th Overall Vuelta Ciclista a Costa Rica
2009
 1st  Road race, National Road Championships
2010
 National Road Championships
1st  Road race
2nd Time trial
 2nd  Time trial, Central American Games
 2nd Overall Vuelta Ciclista a Costa Rica
1st Stage 9
 3rd  Time trial, Central American and Caribbean Games
 8th Time trial, Pan American Road Championships
2011
 1st Stage 1 Vuelta Ciclista a Costa Rica
2013
 1st  Time trial, National Road Championships
2014
 3rd Road race, National Road Championships
 8th Overall Vuelta Ciclista a Costa Rica
1st Stage 9
2015
 3rd Time trial, National Road Championships

References

External links

NBC 2008 Olympics profile

1983 births
Living people
Costa Rican male cyclists
Cyclists at the 2008 Summer Olympics
Olympic cyclists of Costa Rica
Competitors at the 2010 Central American and Caribbean Games